El Salvador competed at the 2020 Summer Olympics in Tokyo. Originally scheduled to take place from 24 July to 9 August 2020, the Games were postponed to 23 July to 8 August 2021, because of the COVID-19 pandemic. It was the nation's twelfth appearance at the Summer Olympics.

Competitors
The following is the list of number of competitors participating in the Games:

Athletics

El Salvador received a universality slot from the World Athletics to send a male athlete to the Olympics.

Track & road events

Boxing

El Salvador entered one boxer to compete in the women's featherweight category into the Olympic tournament. With the cancellation of the 2021 Pan American Qualification Tournament in Buenos Aires, Yamileth Solorzano received a spare berth declined by one of the original entries, as the next highest-ranked boxer vying for qualification from the Americas in the IOC's Boxing Task Force Rankings. This marks the country's return to the sport for the first time since 1988.

Sailing

Salvadoran sailors qualified one boat for each of the following classes through the class-associated World Championships, and the continental regattas.

M = Medal race; EL = Eliminated – did not advance into the medal race

Swimming

El Salvador received a universality invitation from FINA to send two top-ranked swimmers (one per gender) in their respective individual events to the Olympics, based on the FINA Points System of June 28, 2021.

See also
El Salvador at the 2019 Pan American Games

References

Nations at the 2020 Summer Olympics
2020
2021 in Salvadoran sport